Roger Federer was the defending champion, but decided not to participate.

Gaël Monfils won the title beating Jarkko Nieminen in the final, for his first title of the year.

Seeds
The top four seeds received a bye into the second round.

Qualifying

Draw

Finals

Top half

Bottom half

External links
 Main draw
 Qalifing draw

2011 Singles
If Stockholm Open - Singles